(25 March 1932 – 12 April 2017) was a Japanese film director and video artist.

Biography
Matsumoto was born in Nagoya, Aichi Prefecture, Japan and graduated from Tokyo University in 1955. His first short was Ginrin, which he made in 1955. His most famous film is Funeral Parade of Roses (Bara no soretsu). The film was loosely inspired by Oedipus Rex, featuring a transgender woman (portrayed by Peter) trying to move up in the world of Tokyo Hostess clubs.

Matsumoto published many books of photography and was a professor and dean of Arts at the Kyoto University of Art and Design. There, he taught experimental filmmaker Takashi Ito. He was also president of the Japan Society of Image Arts and Sciences. In the early 1980s he taught at the Kyushu Institute of Art and Design (Kyushu Geijutsu Koka Daigaku).

He lived in Tokyo until his death on 12 April 2017.

Filmography

Feature films

Experimental and documentary short films

Other works

Bibliography
 Matsumoto, Toshio, Eizo no hakken (1963)

References

External links

Interview with Toshio Matsumoto - Documentary Box (Interviewer: Aaron Gerow)

1932 births
2017 deaths
Japanese screenwriters
People from Nagoya
Japanese documentary film directors
Japanese experimental filmmakers
20th-century Japanese male actors
Academic staff of Kyoto University of the Arts
Japanese video artists
University of Tokyo alumni